Grant Hampton (born March 27, 2003) is an American soccer player who plays as a midfielder for Mercer Bears.

Club career
Born in Georgia, Hampton was raised in Chatham County and played high school soccer with Islands High School. On January 9, 2020, he signed a USL academy contract with USL League One club Tormenta. The contract allowed him to play professionally while retaining his college soccer eligibility. Due to the COVID-19 pandemic delaying the USL League One season and cancelling the USL League Two season, Hampton did not make an appearance during 2020 season.

Prior to the 2021 season, Hampton re-signed with Tormenta on a USL academy contract. On May 11, 2021, Hampton signed with Tormenta's USL League Two reserve side Tormenta 2. He made his debut for the side that same day in the season opener against Southern Soccer Academy, coming on as a 62nd-minute substitute in the 3–1 victory.

On May 29, 2021, Hampton made his senior debut in the league against Forward Madison, coming on as an 85th-minute substitute in the 1–3 defeat.

In the fall of 2021, Hampton moved to play college soccer at Mercer University.

Career statistics

References

External links
 Profile at Tormenta

2003 births
Living people
Sportspeople from Georgia (U.S. state)
American soccer players
Association football midfielders
Mercer Bears men's soccer players
Tormenta FC 2 players
Tormenta FC players
USL League Two players
USL League One players
Soccer players from Georgia (U.S. state)